Absolution is a 1978 British thriller film directed by Anthony Page and written by playwright Anthony Shaffer. The film stars Richard Burton as a priest who teaches at a boys' school and finds one of his favourite students is playing a nasty practical joke on him. He sets out to investigate the prank and stumbles upon a dead body, leading to his life spiralling out of control.

Plot
The film centres on schoolboy Benjamin Stanfield and his unpopular friend, Arthur Dyson; their form master, Father Goddard and a travelling motorcyclist named Blakey. The film opens with Blakey, arriving at the school. He asks Fr. Goddard if there are any odd jobs that he can do but is told there are none available.

Later Fr. Goddard is watching Dyson rehearse in a school of the operetta Patience. It appears he does not like Arthur while he fawns on Stanfield. In the meantime Blakey has set up camp in the woods near the school. His camp is discovered the next day by Stanfield and some other boys, and Stanfield strikes up a friendship with Blakey.

The next day Fr. Goddard discusses the Catholic concept of confession with his class, during which he tells them that a Catholic priest cannot break the seal of confession, even if it includes a serious crime or murder.

Stanfield, having befriended Blakey begins to spend less time with his friend Arthur. Blakey encourages Stanfield to make up stories about sexual dalliances, which Stanfield later recounts to Fr. Goddard during confession.
The police, called to the school by Fr. Goddard to remove Blakey from the grounds, harass him and  tell him to move on. When Stanfield arrives later, Blakey is still upset and swears at Stanfield who picks up a rock, but what happens next is not shown. Later, in confession Stanfield tells Fr. Goddard that he has accidentally killed Blakey and has buried his body in the woods. Fr. Goddard goes to the wood to see for himself. At the site where the body is supposedly buried he digs and finds what at first he believes to be a head but later turns out to be a pumpkin. At this point boys' laughter is heard, and he realises that he is the victim of a practical joke. The watching boys warn Stanfield, who is among them, that he will be in trouble, but he says that there is nothing Fr. Goddard can do because he was told in confession. After the others leave, Arthur appears and offers to take the blame but Stanfield pushes him to the ground and walks off. When Fr. Goddard catches up with Stanfield, the boy asks for forgiveness, but as Goddard leaves, Stanfield turns and smiles at the others who are looking on.

Stanfield finds Arthur and tells him he can take credit for the joke and later, while the two are in chapel, Arthur enters the confessional to tell Fr. Goddard that he was a willing accomplice. An unseen person then enters, but it is Stanfield's voice that can be heard confessing that this time he really has murdered Blakey. The priest refuses to give absolution, fearing another joke, but again goes to the woods where he discovers Blakey's dead body. He returns to the chapel, where he hears Stanfield's voice in the confessional expressing a desire to kill again and that Arthur will be the next victim. Realising that he cannot tell anyone without breaking the seal of confession Fr. Goddard tries to keep an eye on Arthur and Stanfield. When he sees the boys heading for the woods, he becomes concerned for Arthur's safety and sets off in pursuit but loses sight of them. Later Arthur is not in class, and Fr. Goddard questions Stanfield, who claims that while he and Arthur were together earlier, Arthur became unwell and returned to the school. In a desperate attempt to find Arthur, Fr. Goddard activates the fire alarm but the boy is also absent at the emergency roll call. Fr. Goddard again questions Stanfield and alludes to his confession, but he denies the conversation ever took place. Later, in confession, he is heard apologising for denying the murder earlier, saying he wants to keep it to the confessional, and tells Fr. Goddard where he has buried Arthur's body.

Fr. Goddard goes to the woods again where he finds what appears to be Arthur's leg half exposed in the ground. He hears laughter and demands that the boy come out. When Stanfield appears, Fr. Goddard strikes him in the face, killing him. He then runs back to the chapel and prays for forgiveness, but is interrupted by Stanfield's voice. The priest turns to discover Arthur, who tells him how he imitated Stanfield's voice in the confessional and how it was he that killed Blakey, and later moved the body to another site. Arthur tells him that he did it out of revenge for Fr. Goddard's cruelty. Fr. Goddard says he will take the blame for both the killings and asks Arthur's forgiveness. Refusing it, Arthur tells him he has the choice of confessing to the killings and going to prison for the crime, or committing suicide, a mortal sin. Fr. Goddard falls to his knees in mortification as Arthur walks away whistling.

Cast
 Richard Burton as Father Goddard
 Dominic Guard as Benjamin 'Benjie' Stanfield
 Dai Bradley as Arthur Dyson
 Billy Connolly as Blakey
 Andrew Keir as Headmaster
 Willoughby Gray as Brigadier Walsh
 Preston Lockwood as Father Hibbert
 James Ottaway as Father Matthews
 Brook Williams as Father Clarence
 Jon Plowman as Father Piers
 Robin Soans as Father Henryson
 Trevor Martin as Mr. Gladstone
 Sharon Duce as Louella
 Brian Glover as First Policeman

Production
The screenplay was adapted by Anthony Shaffer from an unperformed stageplay he had written called Play With a Gypsy and was directed by Anthony Page. Christopher Lee was initially considered for the role of Father Goddard before it was given to Richard Burton. Shot on location at Ellesmere College, Shropshire and in Pinewood Studios, the film also stars Dai Bradley, Dominic Guard and the Scottish comedian Billy Connolly, in his debut film role.

The co-stars Sharon Duce, who played the girlfriend of Connolly's character, and Dominic Guard later married.

Alternative ending and cut scenes
There was disagreement between Shaffer and Page as to how the film should end. Rather than reveal Dyson as the murderer, Shaffer wanted the film to retrospectively show the boy's actions throughout, thus gradually leading the viewer to the terrifying conclusion.

A scene in which Arthur reveals his talent for voices by impersonating Father Goddard was cut from the film, as was a scene that reinforces Goddard's apparent hatred of Dyson, in which the priest fast bowls cricket balls at the boy, who is barely able to defend himself. Some of the scenes between Stanfield and Blakey, which reveal more about the pair's relationship, were also cut.

Release
Absolution premiered in the UK in 1978 and went on general release in 1981, but for legal reasons was not released in the United States until 1988, four years after Burton's death.

Reception
Reviews were mixed. Paul Taylor of the Monthly Film Bulletin called Absolution "[a] dire slice of clever narrative trickery”. Leslie Halliwell noted that it was interesting and suspenseful but ultimately too complicated and The Guardian reviewer called it a "second rate murder mystery". Leonard Maltin's Movie Guide referred to the film as "[a] straightforward melodrama [that] loses credibility towards the end". All of them, however, lauded Burton's performance. Dragan Antulov also praised the acting of his co-stars, Connolly, Guard and Bradley. He also found the film to be unexpected and believable and went on to say, "Absolution takes place in isolated yet realistic setting, and the real source of tension is within the characters. Shaffer never takes sides and until the very end the audience is left to sympathise with different characters, never quite certain who among them is good or bad. Because of that constant uncertainty, the atmosphere of the film is very dark and its unusually bitter ending comes as something quite natural".

References

External links

1978 films
British drama films
Films about Catholic priests
Films directed by Anthony Page
Films shot at Pinewood Studios
Films about educators
Films about pranks
Films with screenplays by Anthony Shaffer
Films scored by Stanley Myers
Films set in boarding schools
Films produced by Elliott Kastner
1978 drama films
1970s English-language films
1980s English-language films
1970s British films
1980s British films